Morozovskoye Urban Settlement is the name of several municipal formations in Russia.

Morozovskoye Urban Settlement, a municipal formation corresponding to Morozovskoye Settlement Municipal Formation, an administrative division of Vsevolozhsky District of Leningrad Oblast
Morozovskoye Urban Settlement, an administrative division and a municipal formation which the town of Morozovsk in Morozovsky District of Rostov Oblast is incorporated as

See also
Morozovsky (disambiguation)

References

Notes

Sources

